France was represented by Christine Minier, with the song "Les mots d'amour n'ont pas de dimanche", at the 1987 Eurovision Song Contest, which took place on 9 May in Brussels. Broadcaster Antenne 2 chose the song via a broadcast national final, which would prove to be the last French national final until 1999. At the time of her victory Minier was not a professional singer, nor did she subsequently launch a professional career.

Before Eurovision

National final 
The national final was held on 4 April 1987, hosted by Marie-Ange Nardi and Patrick Simpson. Ten songs took part with the winner chosen by a panel of TV viewers who were telephoned and asked to vote on the songs.

At Eurovision 
On the night of the final Minier performed 15th in the running order, following the United Kingdom and preceding Germany. At the close of voting "Les mots d'amour n'ont pas de dimanche" had received 44 points, placing France 14th of the 22 entries. The French jury awarded its 12 points to the Netherlands.

Voting

References 

1987
Countries in the Eurovision Song Contest 1987
Eurovision
Eurovision